Morton H. Getz (died April 5, 1995) was an American politician from Maryland. He served as a member of the Maryland House of Delegates from 1959 to 1962.

Career
Getz was a Democrat. He served as a member of the Maryland House of Delegates from 1959 to 1962.

Personal life
Getz married Irene Alk. They had three children, Stewart, Shelby and Marc. He lived in Bel Air, Maryland.

Getz died on April 5, 1995. He was interred at Mikro Kodesh Beth Israel Congregation Cemetery.

References

Year of birth missing
1995 deaths
People from Bel Air, Maryland
Democratic Party members of the Maryland House of Delegates